David Anthony Farrell (born May 1956) is a current UK circuit judge who holds the position of "Resident Judge" at Cambridge Crown Court. Farrell was appointed to the South Eastern Circuit on 18 July 2011.

Farrell is due take on the ceremonial position of Honorary Recorder of Cambridge, a civic position revived in 2013. Farell's predecessor Gareth Hawkesworth was appointed to the position following a unanimous vote of Cambridge City Councillors.

Career 

Farrell was called to the Bar (became a barrister) in 1978 and became a Queen's Counsel in 2000. He was appointed as an assistant recorder in 1996 and as a recorder in 2000.

Farrell was the first Queen's Counsel in the UK to achieve accreditation under a new Scheme for High Cost Criminal Cases introduced in 2010.

Farrell served as a director of 36 Bedford Row Limited from 15 June 1995 until 2 December 2000.

Channer/Monteiro Case
In 2011 Farrell presided over a case of the rape of an 11-year-old girl in Luton. Two men, Roshane Channer and Ruben Monteiro, both 21, pleaded guilty. In his sentencing remarks Farrell explained why he was departing from sentencing guidelines, of 11–17 years' custody and imposing sentences of 40 months' imprisonment.

Following the sentencing Attorney General Dominic Grieve made a submission to the Court of Appeal that;

The appeal court replaced Farrell's with sentences of seven years' detention in a young offender institution.

The appeal court found that Farrell had made a technical error when he sentenced the offenders to imprisonment when their sentences involved detention in a young offender institution.

References

External links 
 Image of Farrell as a new QC, May 2000.
 "Couple jailed for stealing at work to fund gambling habit" March 2012.
 "Cambridgeshire police officer jailed over rape inquiry" - August 2012

21st-century English judges
Living people
1956 births